Autobiography is a live recording by pianist and flautist Abdullah Ibrahim (also known as Dollar Brand), taken from a  June 18, 1978, concert in Switzerland. On the recording, Ibrahim recalls his childhood in South Africa through the songs he learned then, progressing to his own compositions in adulthood. Originally released as a two-disc LP set, the album has since been reissued on CD.

Track listing
"What Really Happened in the Cornfields is that the Birds Made Musical all the Day and so I Let a Song Go Out of my Heart at Duke’s Place" – "Anthem For the New Nations"
"Biral"
"Gwidza" – "Yukio-Kahlifa" – "Intro Liberation Dance"
"African Marketplace" – "Tokai" – "Llanga" – "African Sun"
"The Dream"
"Liberation Dance"
"Did You Hear That Sound ?" – "Our Son Tsakwe" – "The Wedding" – "I Surrender Dear" – "One Day When We Were Young"
"Drop Me Off in Harlem"
"Take the "A" Train" – "Coming on the Hudson" – "Moniebah"
"Little Boy"
"Cherry"
"Ishmael" – "Mannenberg" – "Children of Africa"/"Banyana" – "Peace-Salaam" – "Anthem for the New Nations" 
"Khoisan"

References 

Abdullah Ibrahim albums
1978 live albums
Live albums by South African artists